The gray-headed thicket rat (Grammomys caniceps) is a species of rodent in the family Muridae.
It is found in Kenya and Somalia. Its natural habitat is subtropical or tropical dry shrubland.

References

 Boitani, L. & Hutterer, R. 2004.  Grammomys caniceps.   2006 IUCN Red List of Threatened Species.   Downloaded on 19 July 2007.

Grammomys
Rodents of Africa
Mammals described in 1984
Taxonomy articles created by Polbot